Hackham railway station was a railway station on the Willunga railway line serving Hackham, Australia. The station had a raised passenger platform during the passenger transport days of this line. The crossing was protected by flashing lights.

The entire line was dismantled in 1972 and the stop is now a picnic stop on the Coast to Vines Rail Trail.

References

Australian Railway Historical Society Bulletin No 336, October 1965

Disused railway stations in South Australia
Railway stations in Australia opened in 1915
Railway stations closed in 1969
1969 disestablishments in Australia